Axminster railway station serves the town of Axminster in Devon, England. It is operated by South Western Railway and is situated on the West of England Main Line.

History

A signal box was built in 1875 (at the south end of the westbound platform).

The established service pattern was interposed express trains between London Waterloo and other Devon final destinations or Cornwall and local services between Salisbury or Yeovil and Exeter. In 1903 Axminster became a junction when the Lyme Regis branch line was opened. A bay platform (terminus) was built (on the west side) yet the branch climbed at 1 in 80 (1.25%) to cross the main line south of the station by a bridge. A short 1-in-40 connection ran from the goods yard directly to the branch removed in 1915. The engine shed was demolished to make room for the new branch, but a new coal stage and water tank was built next to the terminus. The lever frame in the signal box was extended in 1903 to accommodate the new line, and three years later full signalling on the branch required the building to be extended.

In 1923 the LSWR became part of the Southern Railway during the Grouping of 1923. The platforms were lengthened in the 1930s to accommodate longer trains and the new Axminster Carpets factory making Axminster carpets opened alongside the goods yard in 1937.

On 1 January 1948 the Southern Railway was nationalised to become the Southern Region of British Railways. January 1963 saw all the lines in the area transferred to the Western Region and this was soon followed by the Reshaping of British Railways report. On 29 November 1965 the Lyme Regis branch line was closed; goods traffic had been withdrawn in 1960. On 11 June 1967 the main line was rationalised – Axminster was now in the middle of a  single-track section between Chard Junction and Honiton.

In the late 1980s the line found itself part of British Rail's Network SouthEast sector, which invested in new Class 159 trains and extended the platform southwards to remove the need of passengers to pass beneath a narrow bridge arch to reach the 1930s extension at the north end of the site. The privatisation of British Rail in the 1990s saw the line and station franchised to South West Trains.

Work started February 2009 on a £20 million project which included building a new platform on the site of the disused platform, installing a new footbridge, lifts and waiting shelter, strengthening seven bridges and 20 culverts, installing 12 new signals, replacing three miles of signal cables and modernising the signalling panel at Chard Junction signal box and completed that December with a  passing loop incorporating the station tracks. This allowed the previous sparse, irregular timetable to be replaced with a regular hourly frequency; trains being timetabled to pass at Axminster.

The small building at the end of the main platform since 2009 reopened as a café, situated in the old parcels office.

Since December 2012 Rail Gourmet UK has had its satellite (auxiliary) service centre on site.  An at-seat catering service serves many services from Axminster to Waterloo by hosts based at Axminster on morning train services.  The service centre doubles as a turn-around station for its staff based at Salisbury.

Stationmasters

James McLees 1860 - 1863 (afterwards station master at Honiton)
George R. Stevens 1878 - 1902  (formerly station master at Lympstone)
W.J. Ball 1903 - 1906 (formerly station master at Torrington)
Frederick Reuben Heath 1906 - 1909 (formerly station master at Botley, afterwards station master at Wadebridge)
Harry Hother 1909 - 1919 (formerly station master at Wadebridge)
Arthur J. Hatyer 1926 - 1934 (formerly station master at Seaton Junction)
J. Budd 1934 - 1938 (formerly station master at Parkstone)
Walter James Grayer 1938 - ca. 1950

Location

The station is on the west/south-west edge of the compact but linear town centre.

The main building was designed by the LSWR's architect Sir William Tite and Edward Clifton in mock gothic style. Immediately south of the main building is the 2009-built footbridge between the two platforms. Unusually trains ran on the right but in late 2012, this was reversed: trains now run on the left.

Services

Off-peak, all services at Axminster are operated by South Western Railway using  and  DMUs.

The typical off-peak service in trains per hour is:
 1 tph to  via 
 1 tph to 

This service is operated by Great Western Railway.

See also
 Southern Railway routes west of Salisbury

References

External links 

 Southern E-group: Axminster Station
 The station on navigable O.S. map

Railway stations in Devon
Railway stations in Great Britain opened in 1860
Railway stations served by South Western Railway
Former London and South Western Railway stations
William Tite railway stations
Industrial archaeological sites in Devon
Axminster
Railway stations served by Great Western Railway
DfT Category D stations